Calumet New Tech High School, formerly Calumet High School, is a four-year (9-12) public high school of the Lake Ridge Schools Corporation in unincorporated Lake County, Indiana, United States, near the city of Gary.

See also
 List of high schools in Indiana

References

External links 
Calumet High School Official Site

Public high schools in Indiana
Educational institutions established in 1958
Schools in Lake County, Indiana
Education in Gary, Indiana
1958 establishments in Indiana